Y-matrix may refer to:
 The matrix of admittance parameters, describing an electrical network viewed as a black-box with ports
 The nodal admittance matrix, arising in the nodal analysis of an electrical network